All in My Family is a 2019 American short documentary film directed by Hao Wu. The film follows a traditional heterosexual family where the son is a gay Chinese man who has chosen to have children via surrogates with their same-sex partner Eric. This documentary provides raw footage between Hao and their family's reaction to their sexual orientation, reckoning of kinship, and parenthood. The film showcases how cultural norms and expectations can influence the process of surrogacy; in Hao's case, biological ties are encouraged.

The documentary was released on Netflix on May 3, 2019.

References

External links
 
 

2019 films
2019 short documentary films
Netflix original documentary films
American short documentary films
2010s American films
Surrogacy